North El Monte is a census-designated place (CDP) in the San Gabriel Valley, in Los Angeles County, California, United States. The population was 3,723 at the 2010 census, up from 3,703 at the 2000 census.

Geography

Demographics

2010
At the 2010 census North El Monte had a population of 3,723. The racial makeup of North El Monte was 1,768 (47.5%) White (32.0% Non-Hispanic White), 33 (0.9%) African American, 13 (0.3%) Native American, 1,437 (38.6%) Asian, 4 (0.1%) Pacific Islander, 336 (9.0%) from other races, and 132 (3.5%) from two or more races. Hispanic or Latino of any race were 1,002 persons (26.9%).

The census reported that 3,669 people (98.5% of the population) lived in households, no one lived in non-institutionalized group quarters and 54 (1.5%) were institutionalized.

There were 1,254 households, 426 (34.0%) had children under the age of 18 living in them, 747 (59.6%) were opposite-sex married couples living together, 163 (13.0%) had a female householder with no husband present, 56 (4.5%) had a male householder with no wife present.  There were 46 (3.7%) unmarried opposite-sex partnerships, and 5 (0.4%) same-sex married couples or partnerships. 218 households (17.4%) were one person and 99 (7.9%) had someone living alone who was 65 or older. The average household size was 2.93.  There were 966 families (77.0% of households); the average family size was 3.31.

The age distribution was 742 people (19.9%) under the age of 18, 301 people (8.1%) aged 18 to 24, 962 people (25.8%) aged 25 to 44, 1,109 people (29.8%) aged 45 to 64, and 609 people (16.4%) who were 65 or older.  The median age was 42.2 years. For every 100 females, there were 92.1 males.  For every 100 females age 18 and over, there were 90.6 males.

There were 1,304 housing units at an average density of 3,080.4 per square mile, of the occupied units 945 (75.4%) were owner-occupied and 309 (24.6%) were rented. The homeowner vacancy rate was 0.6%; the rental vacancy rate was 5.2%.  2,761 people (74.2% of the population) lived in owner-occupied housing units and 908 people (24.4%) lived in rental housing units.

According to the 2010 United States Census, North El Monte had a median household income of $63,750, with 5.8% of the population living below the federal poverty line.

2000
At the 2000 census there were 3,703 people, 1,270 households, and 994 families in the CDP. The population density was 8,751.9 inhabitants per square mile (3,404.1/km). The racial makeup of the CDP was 49.76% White, 0.76% African American, 0.27% Native American, 52.17% Asian, 0.05% Pacific Islander, 10.21% from other races, and 2.78% from two or more races. Hispanic or Latino of any race were 15.28%.

Of the 1,270 households 32.8% had children under the age of 18 living with them, 61.0% were married couples living together, 11.5% had a female householder with no husband present, and 21.7% were non-families. 17.9% of households were one person and 8.6% were one person aged 65 or older.  The average household size was 2.87 and the average family size was 3.23.

The age distribution was 23.0% under the age of 18, 6.9% from 18 to 24, 29.9% from 25 to 44, 23.8% from 45 to 64, and 16.4% 65 or older.  The median age was 39 years. For every 100 females, there were 91.8 males.  For every 100 females age 18 and over, there were 88.6 males.

The median household income was $48,583 and the median family income  was $80,000. Males had a median income of $45,195 versus $28,125 for females. The per capita income for the CDP was $19,192.  About 6.2% of families and 7.4% of the population were below the poverty line, including 14.4% of those under age 18 and 4.5% of those age 65 or over.

Government
In the state legislature North El Monte is located in the 29th Senate District, represented by Republican Bob Huff, and in the 49th Assembly District, represented by Democrat Mike Eng. Federally, North El Monte is located in California's 26th congressional district, which is represented by Republican David Dreier.

References

Communities in the San Gabriel Valley
Census-designated places in Los Angeles County, California
Census-designated places in California